The canton of Cère et Ségala is an administrative division of the Lot department, southern France. It was created at the French canton reorganisation which came into effect in March 2015. Its seat is in Biars-sur-Cère.

It consists of the following communes:
 
Belmont-Bretenoux
Biars-sur-Cère
Bretenoux
Cahus
Cornac
Estal
Gagnac-sur-Cère
Gintrac
Girac
Glanes
Laval-de-Cère
Prudhomat
Puybrun
Saint-Michel-Loubéjou
Sousceyrac-en-Quercy
Tauriac
Teyssieu

References

Cantons of Lot (department)